Dhanaula Assembly constituency was one of the 117 assembly constituencies of Punjab, an Indian state, until it was abolished in 2012 delimitation.

Member of Legislative Assembly

Election results

2007

References

External links
 

Former assembly constituencies of Punjab, India